Louis Marshall (1856–1929) was an American lawyer and Jewish leader.

Louis Marshall may also refer to: 

 Louis Marshall (educator) (1773–1866), American educator
 Louis Marshall (rugby league), English rugby league footballer of the 1920s
 Louis Henry Marshall (1827–1890), U.S. Army officer

See also
 Lewis Marshall (born 1988), New Zealand rugby union footballer of the 2010s